Tasmim, is a critical single by Iranian singer, Ebi, released in 2009, just a few months before the controversial 2009 presidential election. Iranian regime election and Iranian Revolution

lyrics
In a part of his Tasmim, Ebi critics the election system of the Islamic Republic:

References 

2009 singles
Political songs
Persian-language songs
2009 songs